The 7th Critics' Choice Awards were presented on January 11, 2002, honoring the finest achievements of 2001 filmmaking.

Top 10 films
(in alphabetical order)

 Ali
 A Beautiful Mind
 In the Bedroom
 The Lord of the Rings: The Fellowship of the Ring
 The Man Who Wasn't There
 Memento
 Moulin Rouge!
 Mulholland Drive
 The Shipping News
 Shrek

Winners and nominees

Film

Television

Freedom Award
Muhammad Ali

Statistics

References

Broadcast Film Critics Association Awards
2001 film awards